Lumendje is a location in Bunyakiri Territory, South Kivu, Democratic Republic of the Congo.

References

Populated places in South Kivu